Siggelkow is a municipality  in the Ludwigslust-Parchim district, in Mecklenburg-Vorpommern, Germany.

References

External links
 Official website

Ludwigslust-Parchim
Grand Duchy of Mecklenburg-Schwerin